Tegelen is a railway station in Tegelen, Netherlands. The station was opened on 21 November 1865 and was closed twice during World War II. The station is located on the Maastricht–Venlo railway, also known as the Staatslijn E. The train services are operated by Arriva.

Train services
The following local train services call at this station:
Stoptrein: Nijmegen–Venlo–Roermond

Bus services
 Line 1: Blerick Vossener–Venlo Station–Venlo Hospital–Tegelen–Tegelen Station–Kaldenkirchen

External links

NS website 
Dutch public transport travel planner 

Railway stations in Venlo
Railway stations opened in 1865
Railway stations on the Staatslijn E